Zuzana Hejdová (born 29 April 1977) is a former Czech tennis player.

Hejdová won two singles and ten doubles titles on the ITF Circuit in her career. On 4 August 2003, she reached her best singles ranking of world No. 222. On 29 September 2003, she peaked at No. 140 in the doubles rankings.

ITF Circuit finals

Singles: 4 (2–2)

Doubles: 25 (10–15)

External links
 
 

1977 births
Living people
Czech female tennis players